Peter Potamus is a purple animated hippopotamus that first appeared in the 1964–1966 animated television series The Peter Potamus Show, produced by Hanna-Barbera and first broadcast on September 16, 1964.

The Peter Potamus Show was divided into three segments: Peter Potamus and So-So, Breezly and Sneezly and Yippee, Yappee and Yahooey. Peter Potamus was a companion series to The Magilla Gorilla Show.  Both series premiered in first-run syndication before being picked up by ABC in January 1966. Peter Potamus ran on Sunday mornings and The Magilla Gorilla Show went to Saturday mornings before moving to Sundays the following year. At that time, the Breezly and Sneezly segment was swapped with Ricochet Rabbit & Droop-a-Long, a segment on The Magilla Gorilla Show. After the ABC run ended in 1967, cartoons from Magilla Gorilla and Peter Potamus shows were syndicated together.

The Ideal Toy Company was the sponsor of the television series, and during the original run of the cartoon, the closing song ended with the phrase: "And there he goes Peter Potamus, our ideal". A similarly subtle sponsor reference appeared in the Magilla Gorilla theme song lyrics: "He's really ideal".

Early promotional materials for the series carried the title Peter Potamus and His Magic Flying Balloon, but that title never appeared on screen.

The original Peter Potamus series was broadcast on the cable TV channel Boomerang, often as part of its anthology series Boomerang Zoo.

Segments

Peter Potamus and So-So
The main segment featured Peter Potamus (voiced by Daws Butler impersonating Joe E. Brown; Butler used an identical voice for Lippy the Lion) and his diminutive sidekick So-So the monkey (voiced by Don Messick). Peter is big, purple, and friendly, dressed in a safari jacket and hat. Episodes generally consisted of Peter and So-So exploring the world in his hot air balloon, which was capable of time travel at the spin of a dial. When faced with a precarious situation, Peter uses his Hippo Hurricane Holler to blow away his opponents.

Breezly and Sneezly

A polar bear named Breezly Bruin (voiced by Howard Morris) and his friend Sneezly the Seal (voiced by Mel Blanc) use various schemes to break into an army camp in the frozen north, while trying to stay one step ahead of the camp's leader Colonel Fuzzby (voiced by John Stephenson).

Yippee, Yappee and Yahooey

Three dogs named Yippee (voiced by Doug Young), Yappee (voiced by Hal Smith), and Yahooey (voiced by Daws Butler impersonating Jerry Lewis) aka The Goofy Guards, work for the King (voiced by Hal Smith), a short, complaining ruler who is often on the receiving end of their antics. The trio's plumed hats and swords are reminiscent of The Three Musketeers.

Episodes

Other appearances
 Peter Potamus and So-So appeared in Yogi's Ark Lark and its spin-off series Yogi's Gang.
 Peter Potamus guest starred in the episode "India and Israel" on Scooby's All-Star Laff-A-Lympics.
 Peter Potamus guest starred in some episodes of Yogi's Treasure Hunt.
 Gold Key Comics published one issue of a Peter Potamus comic book in 1965.
 Peter Potamus made a cameo appearance in The Good, the Bad, and Huckleberry Hound as a captain of a boat to Tahiti.
 Peter Potamus appeared in the early 1990s series Yo Yogi!, where he was voiced by Greg Burson. He and So-So were shown to own a plant store at Jellystone Mall called Peter Potamus' Plant Palace. In "Tricky Dickie's Dirty Trickies", he is shown to be allergic to goldenrods. He later appeared in "Mall or Nothing" as part of the Mall-a-thon.
 Peter Potamus and So-So were seen as animatronics in the Dexter's Laboratory episode "Chubby Cheese" during Chubby's song sequence.
 Potamus was also a recurring character on Harvey Birdman, Attorney at Law, where he is voiced in a Brooklyn accent by Joe Alaskey and later voiced by Chris Edgerly. In it, he is a lecherous glutton and a lazy and sleazy (but inexplicably successful) lawyer in constant pursuit of women and sandwiches. He works at the Sebben & Sebben law firm with Harvey Birdman. Peter has the trademark phrase "Did you get that thing I sent you?" Starting with the episode "Return of Birdgirl", Peter's hands were changed to hooves.
 Peter Potamus appeared in Velma Dinkley's feverish dream in issue #10 'Velma - Warrior Queen of Monsterworld!" of Scooby Apocalypse.
 Peter Potamus and So-So appeared in DC Comics Deathstroke/Yogi Bear Special #1 as captured animals alongside other Hanna-Barbera characters.
 Peter Potamus made a brief cameo in the Wacky Races episode "King Solomon's Races".
 Peter Potamus and So-So also appeared in the 2021 feature film Space Jam: A New Legacy. They are seen watching the basketball game between the Tune Squad and the Goon Squad from their balloon.
 Peter Potamus and So-So appear in the series Jellystone! with Peter Potamus voiced by C.H. Greenblatt and So-So voiced by George Takei. Peter Potamus and So-So are portrayed as Otakus, Peter is also a martial arts specialist who considers his action figures to be his friends. Though has been shown trying to hang out with the other citizens. So-So was seen as Peter's fighting coach. Peter also works as a mail carrier by using his hot air balloon. So-So was silent until the season 2 episode "Balloon Kids".
 Peter's balloon makes a cameo in the background of the "Space Jam Court" stage in the platform fighting game MultiVersus.

Home media
The episode Fe Fi Fo Fun is available on the DVD Saturday Morning Cartoons 1960s Vol. 1.  The episode Wagon Train Strain is available on the Saturday Morning Cartoons 1960's Vol. 2 set. The episode Cleo Trio is on the Hanna Barbera 25 Cartoon Collection DVD, part of The Best of Warner Bros. series.

On November 1, 2016, Warner Archive released The Peter Potamus Show- The Complete Series on DVD in region 1 as part of their Hanna–Barbera Classics Collection.  This is a Manufacture-on-Demand (MOD) release, available exclusively through Warner's online store and Amazon.com.

See also
 List of works produced by Hanna-Barbera Productions
 List of Hanna-Barbera characters

References

External links
 

1964 American television series debuts
1965 American television series endings
American children's animated adventure television series
American children's animated comedy television series
English-language television shows
Fictional hippopotamuses
Animated television series about mammals
1960s American animated television series
Hanna-Barbera characters
Television series by Hanna-Barbera
Television series by Screen Gems
Television series by Sony Pictures Television
Television series by Warner Bros. Television Studios
American Broadcasting Company original programming
First-run syndicated television programs in the United States